Curtitoma novajasemljensis is a species of sea snail, a marine gastropod mollusk in the family Mangeliidae.

Description
The length of the shell varies between 4.9 mm and 33 mm.

The shell has a yellowish ash-color. It is finely and equally decussated by longitudinal and revolving lines. The whorls show a narrow shoulder.

Distribution
This species occurs in European waters and in the Canadian Arctic waters; on the continental shelf of the Alaskan Beaufort Sea

References

 Leche, W. (1878) Ofversight ofver de af Svenska Expeditionema till Novaja Semlja och Jenissej 1875 och 1876 issamlade Hafs-Mollusker. Handlingar Svenska Vetenskaps-Akademiens, 16 (2) : 1–86
 Gofas, S.; Le Renard, J.; Bouchet, P. (2001). Mollusca, in: Costello, M.J. et al. (Ed.) (2001). European register of marine species: a check-list of the marine species in Europe and a bibliography of guides to their identification. Collection Patrimoines Naturels, 50: pp. 180–213

External links
 Nekhaev, Ivan O. "Marine shell-bearing Gastropoda of Murman (Barents Sea): an annotated check-list." Ruthenica 24.2 (2014): 75
  Tucker, J.K. 2004 Catalog of recent and fossil turrids (Mollusca: Gastropoda). Zootaxa 682: 1–1295.
 Schonberg, Susan V., Janet T. Clarke, and Kenneth H. Dunton. "Distribution, abundance, biomass and diversity of benthic infauna in the Northeast Chukchi Sea, Alaska: Relation to environmental variables and marine mammals." Deep Sea Research Part II: Topical Studies in Oceanography 102 (2014): 144–163

novajasemljensis
Gastropods described in 1878